The Pabst Blue Ribbon 2003 China FA Cup  (Chinese: 2003蓝带中国足球协会杯) was the 9th edition of Chinese FA Cup. The cup title sponsor is China Pabst Blue Ribbon.

Results

First round

Zone A, Group 1

Zone A, Group 2

Zone B, Group 1

Zone B, Group 2

Zone C, Group 1

Zone C, Group 2

Zone D, Group 1

Zone D, Group 2

Second round
All matches were postponed from 1–2 May to 16–17 August due to SARS outbreak in China.

Third round

Semi-finals

Final

References

2003
2003 in Chinese football
2003 domestic association football cups